Hemipsilia is a genus of moth in the subfamily Arctiinae. It consists of only one species, Hemipsilia coavestis, which is found from India to Taiwan.

References

Natural History Museum Lepidoptera generic names catalog

Lithosiini
Monotypic moth genera
Moths of Asia